Tate v. Short, 401 U.S. 395 (1971), was a United States Supreme Court case in which the Court held it is a violation of equal protection to convert a fine to jail time simply because the sentenced person cannot pay the fine.

See also
Bearden v. Georgia
Williams v. Illinois

References

External links
 

1971 in United States case law
United States equal protection case law
United States Supreme Court cases
United States Supreme Court cases of the Burger Court